The 1911 Baylor football team was an American football team that represented Baylor University as an independent during the 1911 college football season. In its second season under head coach Ralph Glaze, the team compiled a 2–4–2 record and was outscored by their opponents by a total of 53 to 40.

Schedule

References

Baylor
Baylor Bears football seasons
Baylor Bears football